The Global Refugee-Led Network (GRN), previously known as the Network for Refugee Voices, is an international not for profit organization that organizes advocacy between local and national refugee organizations.

Mandate and structure 
The Global Refugee-Led Network work to make sure that United Nations and other global decision makers are well informed by the voices of refugees.

GPN is organized around six global regions: Africa, Middle East and North Africa, South America, North America, Asia Pacific, and Europe. A representative for each of the six regions form a steering committee.

History 
The Global Refugee-Led Network was previously known as the Network for Refugee Voices. 

The Global Refugee-Led Network participated in the first ever United Nations High Commissioner for Refugees (UNHCR) Global Refugee Forum in 2019.

Activities 
The GPN hosts refugee summits to contribute to the UNHCR Global Refugee Forum and collaborates with the UNHCR's Global Youth Advisory Council. GPN was described as "one of the most influential actors" pushing for participation in the Global Refugee Forum by Refugees International in 2019.

In 8 April 2020, the GPN hosted a global conference with over 100 refugee leaders and called for greater inclusion of refugees in policy making.

References

External links 

 Global Refugee-Led Network official website
Global Refugee Forum official website

United Nations High Commissioner for Refugees
Organizations established in 2019
Refugee aid organizations